Louis "Red" Miller (birthdate unknown)  was a Negro leagues third baseman and manager for several years before the founding of the first Negro National League, and in its first few seasons.

Miller managed the Baltimore Black Sox in 1922 and 1923.

References

External links
 and Baseball-Reference Black Baseball stats and Seamheads

Negro league baseball managers
Baltimore Black Sox players
Lincoln Stars (baseball) players
Philadelphia Giants players
Brooklyn Royal Giants players
Bacharach Giants players
Baseball infielders